Panchanan Biswas is a Bangladesh Awami League politician and the incumbent Member of Parliament from Khulna-1. He is one of the few Hindu Members of parliament in Bangladesh.

Career
Biswas was elected to parliament in 1996 by elections from Khulna-1 as candidate of Bangladesh Awami League candidate. The seat was won in the 1996 general election by Prime Minister Sheikh Hasina. In parliament he questioned Prime Minister Sheikh Hasina in 1998, if the Chittagong Hill Tracts peace treaty had curbed the rights of Bengali People living there. He was reelected in 2001 from Khulna-1.

In 2008, Biswas lost the Bangladesh Awami League nomination from Khulna-1 to Nani Gopal Mandol. He tried to participate in the Khulna-1 election in 2008 as an independent candidate but withdrew his candidacy on 12 December 2008 before the election. He was elected to Parliament in 2014 on a Bangladesh Awami League nomination from Khulna-1. He is a member of the Parliamentary Standing Committee on Public Accounts.

References

1943 births
Living people
People from Khulna District
Awami League politicians
7th Jatiya Sangsad members
8th Jatiya Sangsad members
10th Jatiya Sangsad members
11th Jatiya Sangsad members
Brajalal College alumni
Bangladeshi Hindus